Hills United Football Club, also known as the Hills Brumbies, is a football club based in the Hills District, New South Wales, Australia, that plays in the NSW Premier League.

History
Hills United SC, which later became known as Hills United Brumbies FC, is a club that was formed in the mid-1990s through a partnership between Castle Hill United and Baulkham Hills Soccer Club, to create a pathway for elite and representative footballers in the Hills District. The club began playing out of Fred Caterson Reserve, before in the early 2000s moving to Oakville Oval for a few seasons, followed by a season at Blacktown Sports Park, before landing at their current home at Lilys Football Centre, shared with Blacktown City FC.

Honours
2016 National Premier League 3 Men's Premiers

Notable people
Kyah Simon, later a Matildas player, began her career at the club.

References

External links
 

Soccer clubs in Sydney